Garrett's reed warbler (Acrocephalus musae), sometimes called Society Islands reed warbler or Forster's reed-warbler was a songbird in the genus Acrocephalus. Formerly placed in the "Old World warbler" assemblage (Sylviidae), it is now in the newly recognized marsh warbler family Acrocephalidae. It was endemic to Raiatea and Huahine in the Society Islands.

It was formerly considered a subspecies of the Tahiti reed warbler.

There are 2 subspecies:
 Acrocephalus musae garretti - Huahine Island, extinct (19th century?)
 Acrocephalus musae musae - Raiatea Island, extinct (19th century?)

Footnotes

References 

Garrett's reed warbler
Birds of the Society Islands
Extinct birds of Oceania
Garrett's reed warbler